Alfred Mosher Butts (1899–1993) was an American architect and inventor of Scrabble.

Alfred Butts may also refer to:

Alfred Benjamin Butts (1890–1962), American political scientist and university administrator
Alfie Butts, fictional character

See also
Alfred Butt (disambiguation)